Teays Valley High School is a public high school located at 3887 State Route 752 in Ashville, Ohio. It is the only high school in the Teays Valley Local School District. The school mascot is the Viking.

The mission of Teays Valley High School is for all students to graduate and be prepared for college and career.

Academics

As of the 2013-2014 school year, Teays Valley High School offers courses in the core subjects of English, mathematics, science (physical science, biology, chemistry, physics, environmental science, and anatomy), social studies (world history, US history, US government, and psychology), information technology, foreign language (Spanish, French, and German), and physical education. In addition, electives such as newspaper, yearbook, music (choirs and bands), art (four years), and food classes are offered. The curriculum requires a minimum of four years of English, four years of mathematics, three years of science, three years of social studies, two years of foreign language, one year of info tech, one year of physical education, and several credits of electives.

Honors classes are offered in English, mathematics, and science. The Honors programs of the first two subjects conclude with AP English Literature and Composition and AP Calculus AB, respectively; these are the only two AP classes offered at the high school. The Honors science program typically ends with Honors Physics, a conceptual course, but may include a second year of chemistry and a year of anatomy as well as three years of agricultural science.

In addition, students are offered the Post-Secondary Enrollment Option, which allows them to take college classes through an accredited university while in high school. Many students, particularly seniors, choose this option, sometimes going "full-time PSEO," meaning that all classes taken in a given year are through a university and none through the high school itself. Common choices are Ohio Christian University and Columbus State Community College.

All students are highly encouraged to pursue an education or career after high school. Many graduating students join a branch of the US Military. Many more go to college, around 90% of them attending an Ohio public or private college.

Athletics

As of the 2018–2019 school year, Teays Valley has 18 varsity-level teams. All athletic teams participate in the Mid-State League.

Fall Sports 
 Cheerleading - The competition cheerleading team competes regularly and has placed highly at state and national competitions.
 Cross country (Boys) - The team has won 13 league championships, including seven straight from 2012 to 2018. Additionally, they have had four runners win the individual league championship and had three runners qualify for the state tournament.
 Cross country (Girls) - The girls team has won league titles in 2012 and 2013 and has seen three athletes advance to the state competition.
 Football - Three teams are fielded by the school, Freshmen, Junior Varsity and Varsity. The Varsity team is coached by Mark Weber. The Varsity team has made OHSAA playoff appearances six times (1998, 1999, 2014, 2015, 2020, 2021) and has earned several league championships.
 Golf (Boys) - Two teams offered, Junior Varsity and Varsity
 Golf (Girls)
 Soccer (Boys) 
 Soccer (Girls) - Established in 1993, the team has won three league championships (2007, 2009 and 2010).
 Tennis (Girls)
 Volleyball (Girls)

Winter Sports 
 Basketball (Boys) 
 Basketball (Girls) - With 18 league championships, the girls basketball team is one of the most accomplished athletic teams at TVHS. Additionally, the team has earned five district titles. Several former players have gone on to play at the collegiate-level including five who have played for NCAA Division I teams.
 Bowling (Boys) - Established in 2011, the team has won three league championships (2012, 2014, 2016), one conference championship (2014), one sectional championship (2014), placed sixth at the state tournament in (2014), won red and blue classic for first time (2019).
 Bowling (Girls) - The team has earned one league championship (2016)
 Swimming 
 Wrestling - 1 state champion

Spring Sports 
 Baseball
 Softball 
OHSAA Division I State Champions: 2015
OHSAA Division I State Runner-up: 2016
OHSAA Division I Final Four: 2004, 2015, 2016, 2018
 Tennis (Boys)
 Track and field - Two state champions

Ohio High School Athletic Association State Championships 

 Girls Softball- 2015

Clubs and activities

Clubs 
 Art Club
 Battle of the Books (Book Club)
 Drama Club
 Fellowship of Christian Athletes
 FFA
 FOR Club
 French Club
 In The Know
 German Club(cancelled after german class was cancelled in between 2021-2022 and 2022-2023 school years)
 Key Club
 Mock Trial
 National Honor Society
 Shakespeare's Swords (Creative Writing)
 Student council
 Tides of Pride Equality Club
 TV Current (School Newspaper)
 Ukulele Group
 Viking Voyager (Yearbook)
 Outdoor Adventure

Instrumental Music 
The Director of Instrumental Music at Teays Valley High School is Stephanie K. Smith. Under Ms. Smith, the Marching Band, Concert Band and Wind Ensemble have earned numerous awards and ratings of Superior at the OMEA district and state levels. 
 Concert Band
 Jazz Band
 Marching Band - "Golden Sound" 
 Percussion Ensemble
 Wind Ensemble

Choral Music 
The Director of Choral Music is Eric Farrell. Under his direction, the choirs have earned several awards at OMEA competitions.
 Concert Choir
 Men's Chorus
 Symphonic Choir
 Women's Chorus
 Show choir
 Prominent Rendition is the co-educational show choir at Teays Valley. Competing since 1996, Prominent Rendition has won 88 Overall and Divisional Grand Championships and more than 40 First Runner-up placements. The group has performed in more than a dozen states as well as destinations such as New York City, Chicago, Walt Disney World, on Cruise ships, at the Grand Ole Opry and twice at the OMEA State Conventions. The group is choreographed by A.J. Blankenship.
 Glamorous Edition is the all-female show choir. Since the group's founding during the 2015–16 school year, they have competed at competitions in five states, claiming six divisional titles and 13 divisional placements. The group is choreographed by A.J. Blankenship.

Career and technical 
Many students opt at the end of their sophomore year to attend the Eastland-Fairfield Career & Technical Schools. These allow students to focus on one area or even a specific career path. These students are for all purposes attending the career center, but are eligible to participate in any extracurricular activities that Teays Valley offers, as well. Eastland-Fairfield Career and Technical Schools which offers nearly 40 high school programs designed for students in their junior and senior year.

Technology use

Within the 2019-2022 school years, technology has come to play a more prominent role in student life.

E-mail accounts are given to students as well as teachers
Students are issued a Chromebook each year in a 1-to-1 technology ratio in an attempt to increase students' ability for electronic work
Students have been allowed to use their cell phones in "non-academic" periods

Notable alumni 

 Sarah Fisher, former IndyCar Series driver and owner of Sarah Fisher Hartman Racing
 Champ Henson, former Ohio State and NFL player. Current Pickaway County commissioner

References

External links

 http://www.tvsd.us [District Website]

High schools in Pickaway County, Ohio
Public high schools in Ohio